The Ecclesiastical Household is a part of the Royal Household of the sovereign of the United Kingdom. Reflecting the different constitutions of the churches of England and Scotland, there are separate households in each nation.

England
The Church of England Ecclesiastical Household comprises the College of Chaplains, and the associated Chapel Royal, the Royal Almonry Office, various Domestic Chaplains, and service Chaplains.

The College of Chaplains is under the Clerk of the Closet, an office dating from 1437. It is normally held by a diocesan bishop, who may however remain in office after leaving his see. The current clerk is James Newcome, Bishop of Carlisle. The Deputy Clerk of the Closet, a new office dating only from 1677, is Paul Wright, Domestic Chaplain to the Sovereign and Sub-dean of the Chapel Royal and the sole full-time clerical member of the household. The sub-dean is assisted by Priests-in-Ordinary to the Sovereign.

The Clerk of the Closet is responsible for advising the Private Secretary to the Sovereign on the names for candidates to fill vacancies in the Roll of Chaplains to the Sovereign. He presents bishops for homage to the sovereign; examines any theological books to be presented to the sovereign; and preaches annually in the Chapel Royal, St James's Palace. He receives a salary of £7 a year.

Some three or four chaplains are appointed annually, and one is kept vacant for the sovereign's own choosing.

List of Chaplains in the Household in England
The College of Chaplains consists of those appointed chaplain to the monarch. They are honorary chaplains who do not fulfill any formal duties. They preach once a year in the Chapel Royal.

During the reign of Queen Victoria, there were 36 Chaplains-in-Ordinary and a number of honorary chaplains. A new appointment as chaplain would traditionally be made among the honorary chaplains. Upon his accession in 1901, Edward VII reduced the number of chaplains-in-ordinary to 12 and removed the prerequisite that a chaplain need previously have been appointed an honorary chaplain.

Chaplains appointed as a bishop or to other senior church positions leave the household.

Chaplains in Ordinary
Queen Victoria

 Augustus Frederick Phipps 18 June 1847 – 27 January 1896
 John Barlow ? – 1867 (resigned)
 Edward Meyrick Goulburn – 1866 (resigned, appointed Dean)
 William Henry Brookfield 1 January 1867 – ? (replacing Goulburn)
 William Thomas Bullock 13 September 1867 – ? (replacing Barlow)
 Francis Byng 1872 – 1889 (resigned)
 Francis Pigou, Rural Dean, Vicar of Doncaster 4 July 1874 – ?)
 James Moorhouse, Rural Dean, Vicar of Paddington 4 July 1874 – 1876 (resigned, appointed a bishop)
 Edward Benson, Chancellor of Lincoln Cathedral 11 October 1875 – 1877 (resigned, appointed a bishop)
 George Granville Bradley, 14 September 1876 – ?
 William Henry Bliss, 8 November 1876 – ?
 Henry John Ellison, Honorary Canon of Christ Church, Oxford, Vicar of Windsor 26 December 1879 – 25 December 1899 (deceased)
 John Llewelyn Davies, Rector of Christ Church, Marylebone 10 February 1881 – ?
 Thomas Teignmouth Shore, Vicar of Berkeley Chapel, Mayfair 20 September 1881 – 22 January 1902
 Arthur Robins, Rector of Holy Trinity Church, Windsor 10 October 1882 - 1899 (deceased)
 John Blakeney, Archdeacon of Sheffield, Prebend of York 3 January 1890 - 12 January 1895 (replacing Byng), (deceased)
 Thomas Blundell Hollinshead Blundell, M.A., Rector of Halsall, Ormskirk 31 December 1895 - 1901
 W. Rogers -1896 (deceased)
 James Welldon 1892 - 6 December 1898 (resigned, appointed Bishop)
 Clement Smith, Rector of Whippingham, Isle of Wight 2 March 1896 - 22 January 1901 (replacing Rogers)
 Alfred Ainger 2 March 1896 - 22 January 1901 (replacing Phipps)
 Arthur Lyttelton, 1896 - 6 December 1898 (appointed Bishop)
 John Henry Joshua Ellison, Vicar of Windsor 1896 - 22 January 1901
 Archibald Boyd-Carpenter, MA, Rector of St George´s, Bloomsbury 13 December 1897 - (replacing John Neale Dalton)
 Charles Turner, Rector of St. Georges-in-the-East, London 21 April 1898 - 13 July 1898 (replacing Selwyn), (resigned, appointed Bishop)
 Walter Lawrance, Rector of St Albans, Hertfordshire 13 July 1898 - ?
 Herbert Edward Ryle, Hulsean Professor of Divinity at Cambridge 6 December 1898 - 4 January 1901 (resigned, appointed Bishop)
 William Donne, Vicar of Wakefield 6 December 1898 - ?
 Frederick Cecil Alderson 1 January 1900 - 22 January 1901 (replacing Robins)
 Robert Henry Hadden 1 January 1900 - 22 January 1902 (replacing Ellison)
 Robert Moberly 4 January 1901 - 22 January 1901

King Edward VII

 Alfred Ainger 23 July 1901 - ? 
 fnu Duckworth, 23 July 1901 - ? 
 John Henry Joshua Ellison, Vicar of Windsor 23 July 1901 - 1910
 James Fleming, 23 July 1901 - ? 
 Edgar C. S. Gibson, 23 July 1901 - ? 
 Charles Gore 23 July 1901 - 1 January 1902 (resigned, appointed a bishop)
 Frederick Hervey, Canon of Norwich and Rector of Sandringham 23 July 1901 - ?
 Robert C. Moberly, 23 July 1901 - ?
 Handley Moule, Principal of Ridley Hall, Cambridge 23 July 1901 - September 1901 (resigned, appointed Bishop)
 Thomas Teignmouth Shore, 23 July 1901 - ? 
 Clement Smith, Canon of Windsor and Rector of Whippingham, Isle of Wight 23 July 1901 - 1910
 Leonard Francis Tyrwhitt, 23 July 1901 - ?
 James Adams, Vicar of Stow Bardolph 31 October 1901 - ? (replacing Moule)
 Armitage Robinson 1 January 1902 - October 1902 (replacing Gore), (resigned, appointed Dean)
 Augustus Jessopp, DD, Rector of Scarning, East Dereham 15 November 1902 - (replacing Robinson)

Queen Elizabeth II

John Stott, 1959-1991 and, on his retirement in 1991, an Extra Chaplain.

Honorary chaplains
Queen Victoria

 John Cawston, Chaplain of the Fleet dates unknown
 William Henry Brookfield, Inspector of Schools 24 March 1862 - 1 January 1867
 William Drake, Honorary Canon of Worcester, Rural Dean and Vicar of Holy Trinity Church, Coventry 24 March 1862 - ?
 Lord Wriothesley Russell, Canon of Windsor, Rector of Chenies 28 March 1862 - ?
 Henry Liddell, Dean of Christ Church 28 March 1862 - January 1898 (deceased)
 Arthur Penrhyn Stanley, Regius Professor of Ecclesiastical History, Canon of Christ Church, Oxford 28 March 1862 - ?
 Joseph Lightfoot, Hulsean Professor of Divinity, Fellow and Tutor of Trinity College, Cambridge 28 March 1862 - ?
 John Edward Kempe, Prebend of St Paul's Cathedral and Rector of St. James Church, Westminster 26 June 1862 - ?
 George Protheroe 6 July 1865 - ?
 Thomas James Rowsell, Rector of St. Christopher-le-Stocks, and St. Margaret's, Lothbury 20 January 1866 – 1869
 Stopford Augustus Brooke 1 January 1867 - 1875
 Francis Byng 1867 - 1872
 Francis Pigou, ? - 4 July 1874
 James Moorhouse, ? - 4 July 1874
 Edward Benson, ? - 11 October 1875
 George Bradley, Master of University College, Oxford 4 July 1874 – ?
 William Henry Bliss, Minor Canon of Windsor, and Rector of West Isley, Berkshire 4 July 1874 – 8 November 1876
 Henry John Ellison, Honorary Canon of Christ Church, Oxford, Vicar of St John the Baptist Church, Windsor 11 October 1875 – 26 December 1879
 John Llewelyn Davies, Rector of Christ Church, St. Marylebone 8 November 1876 – 10 February 1881
 Thomas Teignmouth Shore, Vicar of Berkeley Chapel, Mayfair 2 July 1878 – 20 September 1881
 Arthur Robins, Rector of Holy Trinity Church, Windsor, and Chaplain to Her Majesty's Household Troops 7 September 1878 - 10 October 1882
 Edward Glyn, Vicar of Kensington 10 February 1881 - ?
 Arthur Lewis Babington Peile, Vicar of Holy Trinity Church, Ventnor 10 February 1881 - ?
 Randall Davidson, Resident Chaplain to the Archbishop of Canterbury 10 October 1882
 Richard Gee, Vicar of St John the Baptist Church, Windsor 1884-1901
 John Blakeney, Archdeacon of Sheffield, Prebend of York 1886 - 3 January 1890
 James Welldon 1888-1892
 Archibald Boyd-Carpenter ? - 13 December 1897
 John Fenwick Kitto, Vicar of St Martin-in-the-Fields 3 January 1890 - 1901
 John Erskine Clarke, Vicar of Battersea 27 July 1895 - 22 January 1901
 Alfred Ainger, Master of the Temple 28 January 1895 - 2 March 1896
 John Henry Joshua Ellison, Vicar of St Gabriel's, Pimlico and Vicar of St John the Baptist Church, Windsor 28 January 1895 - ?
 Arthur Lyttelton, Vicar of Eccles 27 July 1895 - 1896
 Clement Smith, Rector of Whippingham, Isle of Wight ? - 2 March 1896
 Charles Turner ? - 21 April 1898
 Walter Lawrance, Rector of St Albans, Hertfordshire ? - 13 July 1898
 Herbert Edward Ryle, Hulsean Professor of Divinity at Cambridge 2 March 1896 - 6 December 1898
 William Donne, Vicar of Wakefield 2 March 1896 - 6 December 1898
 Charles Gore, Canon of Westminster 21 April 1898 -
 Edward Perowne, Master of Corpus Christi College, Cambridge 21 April 1898 -
 Robert Moberly, Canon of Christ Church, Oxford and Regius Professor of Pastoral Theology 13 July 1898 - 4 January 1901
 Frederick Cecil Alderson, Canon of Peterborough and Rector of Lutterworth 13 December 1897 - 1 January 1900
 Robert Henry Hadden, Vicar of St Botolph, Aldgate 13 December 1897 - 1 January 1900
 John Stafford Northcote, Vicar of St Andrew's, Westminster, 6 December 1898 - ?
 Handley Moule, Principal of Ridley Hall, Cambridge 6 December 1898 - 22 January 1901
 Henry Pereira, Honorary Canon of Canterbury Cathedral 26 January 1900 - 22 January 1901
 Owen Evans, Warden of Llandovery College 26 January 1900 - 22 January 1901
 Edgar Gibson, Vicar of Leeds 4 January 1901 - 22 January 1901

King Edward VII

E. H. Goodwin, Chaplain to the Forces, first class 1 June 1901 - ? in recognition of his services while Principal Chaplain to the South African Field Force
Thomas Blundell Hollinshead Blundell, M.A., Rector of Halsall, Ormskirk 26 July 1901 - 1905, (deceased)
William Stuart Harris, M.A., Chaplain of the Fleet and Inspector of Naval Schools 26 June 1902 - ?

King George V

King George VI

Queen Elizabeth II
Noël Jones 1983 - 1984
Ray Jones 1984 - 1989
T. J. Thomas-Botwood, MBE 1 July 2022 –

Priests in Ordinary

Queen Victoria
 John Swire

King Edward VII
 H. G. Daniell-Bainbridge, 23 July 1901 - ?
 H. D. Macnamara, 23 July 1901 - ?
 H. A. Sheringham, 23 July 1901 -?
 R. Tahourdin, 23 July 1901 - ?

Queen Elizabeth II
 Trevitt Hine-Haycock
 William Whitcombe
 Jonathan Osborne

Honorary Priests in Ordinary
King Edward VII

 H. Aldrich Cotton, 23 July 1901 - ?
 E. W. Kempe, 23 July 1901 - ?
 Edwin Price, 23 July 1901 - ?
 John Swire, 23 July 1901 - May 1902

Scotland
Her Majesty's Household in Scotland (Ecclesiastical) consists of chaplains who are all ministers of the Church of Scotland.

The current Dean of the Chapel Royal (since 2019) is Professor David Fergusson, who was also appointed Dean of the Thistle at the same time. Other members are the Dean of the Thistle (where held by another individual), and two Domestic Chaplains: the minister at Crathie Kirk (by Balmoral Castle) and the minister at the Canongate Kirk (by the Palace of Holyroodhouse in Edinburgh). There are ten "Chaplains in Ordinary".  Upon retirement the chaplains may be appointed "Extra Chaplains".

List of Chaplains in the Household in Scotland

Chaplains-in-Ordinary to HM in Scotland
King George II
 William Gusthart from 1727 to 1764

Queen Victoria
 Robert Lee, DD 17 December 1846 - 1868
 Norman Macleod ? - 1862 (deceased)
 John Stuart, minister of St Andrew's church, Edinburgh 8 December 1862 - ? (replacing Macleod)
 Archibald Watson, 2 May 1868 -  in place of Robert Lee, deceased
 Robert Herbert Story, 1886-

King Edward VII
 Archibald Charteris, 18 October 1901 - 1908
 Donald Macleod, 18 October 1901 - 1910
 Cameron Lees, 18 October 1901 - 1910
 James MacGregor, 18 October 1901 - 1910
 Robert Herbert Story, 18 October 1901 - 1907
 J. R. Mitford Mitchell, 18 October 1901 - 1910
 Samuel James Ramsay Sibbald, Minister of the Parish of Crathie 30 June 1903 - ? (in place of Charteris, deceased)

King George V
 Donald Macleod, 7 May 1910 - 1916
 Cameron Lees, 7 May 1910 - 1913
 James MacGregor, 7 May 1910 - 1910
 J. R. Mitford Mitchell, 7 May 1910 - 1925
 Wallace Williamson, 7 May 1910 - 1926
 Samuel James Ramsay Sibbald, 7 May 1910 - 1936
 Pearson McAdam Muir, Moderator of the General Assembly of the Church of Scotland 16 December 1910 - 1924 (in place of MacGregor, deceased)
 Robert Howie Fisher, minister of Morningside, Edinburgh 25 July 1913 - ? (in place of Lees)
Alexander Miller Maclean, 27 October 1914 - 1925 (in place of J.R. Mitford Mitchell, deceased)
 William Paterson Paterson, 10 March 1916 - 1936 (in place of Macleod)
John White, 8 August 1924 - (in place of Muir, deceased)
 Archibald Main, Regius Professor of Ecclesiastical History, University of Glasgow 29 May 1925 - 1936 (in place of Alexander Miller Maclean, deceased)
 Norman MacLean, Collegiate Minister of St. Cuthbert's, Edinburgh 24 August 1926 - 1936 (in place of Wallace Williamson, deceased)
 Alexander Martin, Principal of New College, Edinburgh. 8 November 1929 - 1936
 Robert J. Drummond, 8 November 1929 - 1936
 Donald Fraser, 8 November 1929 - 1933
 George Adam Smith, 3 October 1933 - 1936 (in place of Donald Fraser)
 Charles Warr, Dean of the Chapel Royal and Dean of the Thistle, 8 November 1934 - 1936 (in place of Robert Howie Fisher; extra Chaplain in 1934)
 John White

King Edward VIII

 Samuel James Ramsay Sibbald, 21 July 1936 - 1937
 William Paterson Paterson, 21 July 1936 - 1937
 John White, 21 July 1936 - 1937
 Archibald Main, 21 July 1936 - 1937
 Norman MacLean, 21 July 1936 - 1937
 Alexander Martin, 21 July 1936 - 1937
 Robert J. Drummond, 21 July 1936 - 1937
 George Adam Smith, 21 July 1936 - 1937
 Charles Warr, 21 July 1936 - 1937

King George VI
Samuel James Ramsay Sibbald, 2 March 1937 - 1950
William Paterson Paterson, 2 March 1937 -
John White, 2 March 1937 -
Archibald Main, 2 March 1937 - 1947
Norman MacLean, 2 March 1937 -
Alexander Martin, 2 March 1937 - 1946
Robert J. Drummond, 2 March 1937 - 1951
Sir George Adam Smith, 2 March 1937 - 1942
Charles Laing Warr, 2 March 1937 - 1952
James Macdougall Black, 5 May 1942 - 1948 (in place of Sir George Adam Smith, deceased)
James Hutchinson Cockburn, 24 November 1944 - 1952 (in place of John Stirton, deceased)
Andrew Nevile Davidson, 30 July 1946 - 1952 (in place of Alexander Martin, deceased)
John Baillie, 3 June 1947 - 1952 (in place of Archibald Main, deceased)
William White Anderson, 15 November 1949 - 1952 (in place of James Black, deceased)
John Henry Duncan, 31 October 1950 - 1951 (in place of Samuel Sibbald, deceased)
Thomas Bentley Stewart Thomson, 16 March 1951 - 1952 (in place of John Henry Duncan, deceased)
James Pitt Watson, 17 August 1951 - 1952 (in place of Robert J. Drummond, deceased)

Queen Elizabeth II

Charles Laing Warr 1 Aug 1952 - 9 Dec 1969  
James Hutchison Cockburn 1 Aug 1952 - 1973
Andrew Nevile Davidson 1 Aug 1952 - 1969
John Baillie 1 Aug 1952 - 1960
William White Anderson 1 Aug 1952 -
Thomas Bentley Stewart Thomson 1 Aug 1952 - 1959 (thereafter Extra chaplain)
Professor James Pitt Watson 1 Aug 1952 - 1963
Professor James Stuart Stewart 1 Aug 1952 - 1966
John Annand Fraser 1 Aug 1952 - 23 June 1964   (thereafter Extra Chaplain)
John Lamb 1 Aug 1952 - (Domestic Chaplain Balmoral)
Hugh Osborne Douglas, 17 December 1959 - (in place of Thomas Thomson, resigned)
Ronald William Vernon Selby Wright, 24 May 1963 - (in place of James Pitt Watson, deceased)
Henry Charles Whitley, 24 May 1963 - 1976  thereafter Extra Chaplain
Anderson Nicol  23 June 1964 - 1972   (in place of John Annand Fraser)
Robert Leonard Small 12 September 1967 - 1975 (in place of Edgar Primrose Dickie, retired) thereafter Extra Chaplain
W R Sanderson
William Morris 15 April 1969 - (in place of Nevile Davidson, retired)
George Thomson Henderson Reid 1969 - 1980    (in place of Charles Laing Warr, deceased)
James Boyd Prentice Bulloch 1980 - 1981   (in place of Reid, retired)
William Bryce Johnston 1981 - 1991   (in place of Bulloch, deceased)
Harry William Macphail Cant 1972 - 1991   (in place of Anderson Nicol, deceased)
Kenneth Macvicar 1974 - 1991 
John McIntyre 1975-1986  (in place of Robert Leonard Small, retired)
 William Henry Rogan - 1978  thereafter Extra Chaplain
 Robin Barbour 1976- 1991   (in place of Henry Whitley, retired)
 Allan Young 1978 - 1979    (in place of Rogan, retired)
Gilleasbuig Macmillan 1979 - 2014  (in place of Young, deceased)
James Leslie Weatherhead 11 April 1991 -2017  (in place of Harry William MacPhail Cant, deceased)
Mary Irene Levison  11 May 1991 - 29 January 1993   (in place of RAS Barbour, retired) (thereafter Extra Chaplain)
Andrew Stewart Todd 1991 -  (in place of MacVicar, retired)
Charles Robertson 1991 - 2010  (in place of Johnston, retired)
Iain Torrance 2001 - 2019 - 
James Alexander Simpson 21 July 1992 - 2004  (in place of Alwyn James Cecil Macfarlane, retired)
 Norman Walker Drummond 29 Jan 1993 - 2022    (in place of Levison, retired)
 John Paterson - 2008  
 James Gibson 2004 - 2018  (afterwards extra Chaplain)
 Angus Morrison 2006 - 
 Kenneth MacKenzie 2007 -  (Domestic chaplain)
 Lorna Hood 2008 -  (in place of Paterson, retired)
 Neil Gardner 2008 -  (Domestic chaplain)
 Alistair Bennett 2010 - 2022 
 Susan Brown 2012- 
 John Chalmers 2013- 
 Finlay Macdonald 2001 - 2015 
 David Fergusson 2015 - 
 Alastair Symington 1996 - 2017 
 George Cowie 2017 - 2022 
 James Gibson - 2018 
 Liz Henderson 2018 -  (in place of Gibson)
 George Whyte 2019 - 
 Dr Marjory Maclean 2022 -  (in place of Cowie, deceased)
 Dr Grant Barclay 2022 -  (in place of Drummond)
 Prof John Swinton 2022 -  (in place of Bennett)

Extra Chaplains-in-Ordinary to HM in Scotland
King Edward VII

 Malcolm C. Taylor, 18 October 1901 - ?

King George V

 Malcolm C. Taylor, 7 May 1910 - ?
 Charles Laing Warr 12 March 1926.

Queen Elizabeth II
George Thomson Henderson Reid 1980 -  
Kenneth Macvicar 1991 - 
William Bryce Johnston 1991 - 
Gilleasbuig Macmillan 2014- 
Iain Torrance 2019 -

References

Christianity and society in the United Kingdom
Positions within the British Royal Household
Ecclesiastical Household
Ecclesiastical Household